In the branch of abstract algebra known as ring theory, a minimal right ideal of a ring R is a non-zero right ideal which contains no other non-zero right ideal. Likewise, a minimal left ideal is a non-zero left ideal of R containing no other non-zero left ideals of R, and a minimal ideal of R is a non-zero ideal containing no other non-zero two-sided ideal of R .

In other words, minimal right ideals are minimal elements of the partially ordered set (poset) of non-zero right ideals of R ordered by inclusion.  The reader is cautioned that outside of this context, some posets of ideals may admit the zero ideal, and so the zero ideal could potentially be a minimal element in that poset. This is the case for the poset of prime ideals of a ring, which may include the zero ideal as a minimal prime ideal.

Definition
The definition of a minimal right ideal N of a ring R is equivalent to the following conditions:
N is a simple right R-module.

Minimal ideals are the dual notion to maximal ideals.

Properties

 In a ring with unity, maximal right ideals always exist. In contrast, minimal right, left, or two-sided ideals in a ring with unity need not exist.
 The right socle of a ring  is an important structure defined in terms of the minimal right ideals of R.
 Rings for which every right ideal contains a minimal right ideal are exactly the rings with an essential right socle.
 Any right Artinian ring or right Kasch ring has a minimal right ideal.
 Domains that are not division rings have no minimal right ideals.
 In rings with unity, minimal right ideals are necessarily principal right ideals, because for any nonzero x in a minimal right ideal N, the set xR is a nonzero right ideal of R inside N, and so .
 If N1 and N2 are non-isomorphic minimal right ideals of R, then the product  equals {0}.
 If N1 and N2 are distinct minimal ideals of a ring R, then 
 A simple ring with a minimal right ideal is a semisimple ring.
 In a semiprime ring, there exists a minimal right ideal if and only if there exists a minimal left ideal .

Generalization
A non-zero submodule N of a right module M is called a minimal submodule if it contains no other non-zero submodules of M. Equivalently, N is a non-zero submodule of M which is a simple module. This can also be extended to bimodules by calling a non-zero sub-bimodule N a minimal sub-bimodule of M if N contains no other non-zero sub-bimodules.

If the module M is taken to be the right R-module RR, then the minimal submodules are exactly the minimal right ideals of R. Likewise, the minimal left ideals of R are precisely the minimal submodules of the left module R&hairsp;R. In the case of two-sided ideals, we see that the minimal ideals of R are exactly the minimal sub-bimodules of the bimodule R&hairsp;RR.

Just as with rings, there is no guarantee that minimal submodules exist in a module. Minimal submodules can be used to define the socle of a module.

References

External links
 http://www.encyclopediaofmath.org/index.php/Minimal_ideal

Abstract algebra
Ring theory
Ideals (ring theory)